The Rutland-3 Representative District is a two-member state Representative district in the U.S. state of Vermont.  It is one of the 104 one or two member districts into which the state was divided by the redistricting and reapportionment plan developed by the Vermont General Assembly following the 2010 U.S. Census.  The plan applies to legislatures elected in 2012, 2014, 2016, 2018, 2020.  A new plan will be developed following the 2020 U.S. Census.

The Rutland-3 District includes all of the Rutland County towns of Castleton, Fair Haven, Hubbardton, and West Haven.

As of the 2010 census, the state as a whole had a population of 625,741. As there are a total of 150 representatives, there were 4,172 residents per representative (or 8,343 residents per two representatives). The two member Rutland-2 District had a population of 8,871 in that same census, 6.32% above the state average. (Vermont Legislature)

District Representatives
William Canfield, Republican, 2012–2014, 2015–2016, 2017–2018.
Robert Helm, Republican, 2012–2014, 2015–2016, 2017–2018.

Candidates for 2018
Candidate information obtained from Vermont Secretary of State website.

 William "Bob" Canfield, Republican
 Robert "Bill" Helm, Republican
 Robert J. Richards, independent

See also
Members of the Vermont House of Representatives, 2005-2006 session
Vermont Representative Districts, 2002-2012

References 

Vermont Secretary of State. "Election Results". (August 14, 2018 primary election). Web.

Vermont Legislature. "House District Statistics". 2012. Web.

Vermont Secretary of State. "Election Results". 2014. Web.

Vermont Secretary of State. "Representative Redistricting for 2012". 2012. Web.

U.S. Census Bureau. 2010 Census Interactive Population Search. Web. 28 Aug. 2014

External links
Vermont legislature web pages related to reapportionment

43.644812966281954, -73.21298522741098

Castleton, Vermont
Fair Haven, Vermont
Hubbardton, Vermont
West Haven, Vermont